Frederica or Fredrica may refer to:
 Frederica (given name), including a list of notable people who bear the name
 Frederica (novel), a romance novel by Georgette Heyer
 Frederica, Delaware, United States
 Frederica Academy, an American school
 Fort Frederica, a historic American fort
 Frederica naval action, a small naval battle during the American Revolutionary War
 Frederica Bernkastel, a character in the Japanese sound novel Higurashi no Naku Koro ni
 Princess Frederica (disambiguation), including princesses named Frederika  and Friederike
 Frederica (1932 film), a German historical musical drama film
 Frederica (1942 film), a French comedy film

See also
 Erica (disambiguation)
 Frederika (disambiguation)
 Fredrika (disambiguation)
 Friederike (disambiguation)
 Fredrique Löwen (Fredrica Löf), (1760–1813), Swedish actress
 Maria Frederica von Stedingk, Swedish composer